Giro is an unincorporated community located at the northernmost point of Gibson County in Washington Township, Gibson County, Indiana. The town is also known as Buena Vista.

History
It was platted in 1848 as Buena Vista. The Giro post office was discontinued in 1907.

Geography

References

Unincorporated communities in Gibson County, Indiana
Unincorporated communities in Indiana